Highway 216 (AR 216, Ark. 216, and Hwy. 216) is an east–west state highway in Perry County, Arkansas. The route of  runs from AR 9 east to AR 60/AR 113. The route is two–lane, undivided.

Route description
The route begins at AR 9 south of Perryville. AR 216 runs along the southern shore of Lake Harris Brake to Antioch, where a concurrency begins with AR 300. The routes run north until the northeast corner of the Lake, when AR 300 turns west, and AR 216 continues north. AR 216 winds northeast to Houston, where it terminates at AR 60/AR 113.

Major intersections

See also

 List of state highways in Arkansas

References

External links

216
Transportation in Perry County, Arkansas